Mojo Record Bar is an independent record store and bar in Sydney, Australia, founded by Daniel McManus and Jon Ruttan in 2012.

References

External links

Music retailers of Australia
Drinking establishments in Australia
Companies based in Sydney
Australian companies established in 2012